The track surface of a horse racing track refers to the material of which the track is made. There are three types of track surfaces used in modern horse racing. These are:

Turf, the most common track surface in Europe
Dirt, the most common track surface in the US
Artificial or Synthetic, the collective term for a number of proprietary man-made surfaces in use at a number of locations around the world.

The style of racing differs between surfaces, with dirt races tending to have the fastest pace, while turf racing often comes down to a sprint in the stretch. Races on artificial surfaces tend to play out somewhere in between. Anecdotally, American bettors consider dirt racing to be more predictable, which makes it a more popular medium for betting purposes. Weather conditions affect the speed of the different surfaces too, and grading systems have been developed to indicate the track condition (known as the "going" in the UK and Ireland). Turf surfaces are the most affected by changes in the weather, and many turf horses will have a strong preference for a specific type of going.

Synthetic surfaces

Synthetic surfaces allow racing to take place in bad weather conditions, when it may otherwise be cancelled, and for this reason are sometimes referred to as All Weather surfaces. Manufacturers of synthetic racetrack surface materials promote the fact that synthetic tracks have drainage attributes that are better than natural surfaces.

There is also evidence that synthetic surfaces are significantly safer than dirt in terms of equine breakdowns, though there are many variables that come into play. The statistics for North America in 2015 showed 1.18 fatalities per 1,000 starts on synthetic surfaces, 1.22 on grass courses, and 1.78 on dirt tracks. The breakdown rates were down for each of the surfaces compared to 2014.

The first synthetic surface used for thoroughbred racing was Tropical Park's Tartan turf, a synthetic surface similar to Astroturf installed in 1966. Tartan turf was never a success with horsemen.

The first synthetic surface to replace dirt in the United States was installed at The Meadows Racetrack and Casino in Washington, Pennsylvania in 1963. This surface, called Tartan, was found to be unsatisfactory and removed and replaced with a traditional limestone surface in 1975.

References

External links
 http://www.equestriansurfaces.co.uk/
 https://www.premierplaysolutions.co.uk/surfacing-and-daily-mile-circuits/rubber-mulch-surfacing
 http://www.martincollins.com/
 http://www.prorideracing.com
 http://www.tapetafootings.com/
 http://www.viscoride.com.au/
 https://www.visteks.net/ and https://web.archive.org/web/20150620225049/http://rashittrack.com/

Horse racing terminology